İkinci Meyniman (also, Meyniman and Meyniman Vtoroye) is a village and the least populous municipality in the Hajigabul Rayon of Azerbaijan.  It has a population of 300.

References 

Populated places in Hajigabul District